The Luxor African Film Festival (LAFF) is an annual film festival for African cinema in Luxor, Egypt. In October 2019 the Malmö Arab Film Festival recognized LAFF for having "made great strides and [become] one of the most important festivals specialized in African cinema".

Luxor African Film Festival is run by the Independent Shabab Foundation (ISF). Writer Sayed Fouad and director Azza al-Husseny were involved as cofounders. First conceived in mid-2010, the first festival took place in February 2012.

Prizes
The festival awards prizes for both short and long films. In 2013 the prizes were as follows:
 The Grand Nile Prize for Best Long Film: $10,000 and The Golden Mask of Tutankhamen
 The Jury Prize for Long Film: $8,000 and The Silver Mask of Tutankhamen
 The Prize for Best Artistic Contribution in a Long Film: $5,000 and The Bronze Mask of Tutankhamen
 The Grand Nile Prize for Short Film: $5,000 and The Golden Mask of Tutankhamen
 The Jury Prize for Short Film: $4,000 and The Silver Mask of Tutankhamen
 The Prize for Best Artistic Contribution in a Short Film: $3,000 and The Bronze Mask of Tutankhamen

Annual editions

References

Film festivals in Egypt
Film festivals established in 2012
Luxor